The Henry F. Barker House is a historic house at 103 Greenleaf Street in Quincy, Massachusetts.  The -story wood-frame house was built in 1871 for Henry F. Barker, owner of some of Quincy's largest granite quarries.  It is one of the best-preserved Italianate houses on Greenleaf Street, which is lined with fashionable 19th-century houses.  The L-shaped house has paired brackets and dentil moulding in the eaves, projecting polygonal window bays with similar features, and a decorated porch in the crook of the L.

The house was listed on the National Register of Historic Places in 1989.

See also
National Register of Historic Places listings in Quincy, Massachusetts

References

Houses in Quincy, Massachusetts
Italianate architecture in Massachusetts
Houses completed in 1871
National Register of Historic Places in Quincy, Massachusetts
Houses on the National Register of Historic Places in Norfolk County, Massachusetts